Madeleine Daly Potter is an American actress who has played roles in over 20 films and TV shows, including four productions directed by James Ivory. She has also appeared in numerous stage productions in the United States and United Kingdom. She made her New York stage debut in Loves Labor's Lost at The Shakespeare Center, produced by the Riverside Shakespeare Company in 1981.

Family
Potter is the only daughter of Philip B.K. Potter (1927-1975), an American diplomat who served in the OSS, and his wife, the former Madeleine Mulqueen Daly (1921-1985). She is a niece of Medal of Honor recipient Michael J. Daly and a great-great-granddaughter of New York Mayor Thomas Francis Gilroy. She is also a great-great-granddaughter of Episcopal bishop Alonzo Potter and a great-grand-niece of Episcopal bishop Henry Codman Potter.

Personal life
She was married to Patrick Fitzgerald, an Irish-born American actor, whom she wed in 1990.

Potter's only child, Madeleine Daly (born June 4, 1995), appeared as her character's niece in the 2005 movie The White Countess.

Selected filmography
 The Bostonians (1984) - Verena Tarrant
 Hello Again (1987) - Felicity Glick
 The Suicide Club (1988) - Nancy
 Bloodhounds of Broadway (1989) - Widow Mary
 Slaves of New York (1989) - Daria
 Two Evil Eyes (1990) - Annabel (segment "The Black Cat")
 Leapin' Leprechauns! (1995) - Morgan de la Fey/Nula (uncredited)
 Spellbreaker: Secret of the Leprechauns (1996) - Morgan de la Fey/Nula
 The Golden Bowl (2000, Merchant Ivory) - Lady Castledean
 Refuge (2002) - Sylvia Oakes
 The White Countess (2005) - Greshenka
 Red Lights (2012) - Sarah Sidgwick

Television
 State of Play - Professor Tate
 Midsomer Murders "Country Matters" (2006) - Celia Patchett
 Holby City (2013) - Sharon Kozinsky

Audio
 Doctor Who - Assassin in the Limelight (2008) - Lizzie Williams
 Doctor Who - The Cradle of the Snake (2010) - Yoanna Rayluss

Stage

London
 An Ideal Husband, directed by Peter Hall (1996) at Haymarket Theatre
 Southwark Fair, directed by Nicholas Hytner (2006) at Royal National Theatre
 After Mrs. Rochester, written and directed by Polly Teale (2003) at the Lyric Theatre and then the Duke of York's
 Broken Glass, directed by Iqbal Khan (2010) at the Tricycle Theatre

Broadway
 Ibsen's Ghosts (1982) - Regina Engstrand, Mrs. Alving's maid
 Coastal Disturbances (1987) - Holly Dancer
 Metamorphosis (1989) - Greta, Gregor Samsa's sister
 The Crucible (1991) - Abigail Williams
 Getting Married (1991) - Leo
 The Master Builder (1992) - Hilde Wangel
 A Little Hotel on the Side (1992) - Victoire

References

External links
 
 
 Madeleine Potter at ITDb Theatre Database

American Shakespearean actresses
American stage actresses
American film actresses
Actresses from Washington, D.C.
Living people
1958 births
20th-century American actresses
21st-century American actresses